John Walter Edward Montagu-Scott, 2nd Baron Montagu of Beaulieu  (10 June 1866 – 30 March 1929), was a British Conservative politician, soldier and promoter of motoring. He is the father of Edward Douglas-Scott-Montagu, 3rd Baron Montagu of Beaulieu who would go on to found the National Motor Museum, Beaulieu in Montagu's memory.

Background, education and early life
Montagu was the eldest son of Henry Montagu-Scott, 1st Baron Montagu of Beaulieu, second son of Walter Montagu Douglas Scott, 5th Duke of Buccleuch. His mother was the Hon. Cecily Susan, daughter of John Stuart-Wortley, 2nd Baron Wharncliffe. He went to Eton College     where he rowed, and shot for his school at Wimbledon. He then went to New College, Oxford and helped the New College boat to the Head of the River. He rowed for the Oxford Etonians in the 1887 Grand Challenge Cup with Guy Nickalls and Douglas McLean although without success. He worked for a year in the sheds of the London and South Western Railway and became a practical engineer. He subsequently travelled around the world with his cousin, Lord Ancram, and his friend, Lord Ennismore.

Political career
Montagu entered Parliament for New Forest in 1895, a seat he held until 1905, when he succeeded his father in the barony and entered the House of Lords. During the First World War Montagu was an acting member of the War Aircraft Committee from March to April 1916 and an adviser on Mechanical Transport Services to the Indian government (with the rank of Honorary Brigadier-General). He is chiefly remembered as a promoter of motoring and was the founder and editor of The Car Illustrated magazine and a member of the Road Board.

Family

Lord Montagu of Beaulieu married firstly his cousin Lady Cecil Kerr, daughter of Schomberg Kerr, 9th Marquess of Lothian and Lady Victoria Montagu Douglas Scott in 1889. She died in September 1919, aged 53. He married secondly Alice Pearl, daughter of Major Edward Barrington Crake, in 1920. There were children from both marriages, including Elizabeth. Lord Montagu of Beaulieu died in March 1929, aged 62, and was succeeded in the barony by his only son, Edward. Lady Montagu of Beaulieu later remarried and died in April 1996, aged 101.

During his first marriage Beaulieu had a daughter by his mistress and secretary Eleanor Velasco Thornton. Wanting an appropriate mascot for his Rolls-Royce, and using Eleanor Thornton as a model, the sculptor Charles Robinson Sykes was commissioned to design the precursor (called "The Whisper") of the Spirit of Ecstasy; the famous winged mascot that has adorned nearly every Rolls-Royce car since 1911. On 30 December 1915, with Thornton, Montagu was on board the SS Persia sailing through the Mediterranean on the way to India when the ship was torpedoed without warning by the German U-boat  commanded by Max Valentiner. Thornton drowned, along with hundreds of others, but Montagu survived the sinking.

Further reading
Kidd, Charles, Williamson, David (editors). Debrett's Peerage and Baronetage (1990 edition). New York: St Martin's Press, 1990,

External links 
 
 The Rowers of Vanity Fair  – Douglas-Scott-Montagu, John Walter Edward

1866 births
1929 deaths
People educated at Eton College
Alumni of New College, Oxford
John
Companions of the Order of the Star of India
Deputy Lieutenants of Hampshire
Knights Commander of the Order of the Indian Empire
Douglas-Scott-Montagu, John E
Douglas-Scott-Montagu, John E
Douglas-Scott-Montagu, John E
Douglas-Scott-Montagu, John E
UK MPs who inherited peerages
John